Ammadam (Ammayude Idam or Aa madom, literally meaning 'the place of mother') is a village in the Thrissur district of Kerala state in India, where traditional Ammadam is about  away from the town of Thrissur. Until recently, the main occupation of the residents was farming or related to agriculture. The area is under the Parlam panchayat.

Governance
Ammadam falls under The Paralam Panchayath, The Paralam panchayath is consolidation of 5 villages namely Ammadam, Kodannur, pallippuram, venginissery and Chenam.

Formerly Ammadam was under Cherpu constituency but now it is under Nattika.

References 

Villages in Thrissur district